Eberardo Villalobos Schad (1 March 1908 – 26 June 1964)  was a Chilean football attacker who represented the Chile national team in three matches at the 1930 FIFA World Cup. He was played in the Chilean league in Rangers.

References

External links

1908 births
Chilean footballers
Chile international footballers
Rangers de Talca footballers
1930 FIFA World Cup players
1964 deaths
Association football forwards